Pavlo Schedrakov (born 17 January 1985 in Ukrainian SSR) is a Ukrainian retired football defender and current manager.

Career
Schedrakov is a product of the Kaskad Slavutych youth sportive school system. He spent his career in the Ukrainian football clubs of the different levels and also played one season in the Ukrainian Premier League (with newly promoted FC Hoverla). In July 2013 he returned to Desna Chernihiv.

Honours
Desna Chernihiv
 Ukrainian First League: (1) 2017–18
 Ukrainian Second League: (2) 2005–06, 2012–13

Gallery

References

External links
 
 

1985 births
Living people
Ukrainian footballers
Association football defenders
Ukrainian Premier League players
FC Borysfen-2 Boryspil players
FC Systema-Boreks Borodianka players
FC Krymteplytsia Molodizhne players
FC Hoverla Uzhhorod players
FC Desna Chernihiv players
FC Kudrivka players
Ukrainian football managers
Ukrainian First League players
Ukrainian Second League players